Guidina Dal Sasso (born 16 January 1958) is an Italian cross-country skier and mountain runner who competed from 1982 to 2002. Her best World Cup finish was fourth twice, earning one each in 1985 and 1986. In 1985 she came third in the World Mountain Running Championships, and was a member of the winning team.

Biography
Dal Sasso, born in Asiago, also competed in three Winter Olympics, earning her best finish of tenth in the 10 km event at Calgary in 1988. Her best finish at the FIS Nordic World Ski Championships was seventh in the 20 km event at Oberstdorf in 1987. She won five times the Marcialonga.

Dal Sasso has two children with Ferdinando Longo Borghini: Paolo and Elisa, both are professional cyclists.

Achievements

Cross-country skiing results
All results are sourced from the International Ski Federation (FIS).

Olympic Games

World Championships

World Cup

Team podiums
 3 podiums – (3 )

References

External links
 
 
 Guidina Dal Sasso at Fondo Italia

1958 births
Cross-country skiers at the 1984 Winter Olympics
Cross-country skiers at the 1988 Winter Olympics
Cross-country skiers at the 1994 Winter Olympics
Italian female cross-country skiers
Living people
Olympic cross-country skiers of Italy
Universiade medalists in cross-country skiing
People from Asiago
Italian female mountain runners
Universiade silver medalists for Italy
Competitors at the 1985 Winter Universiade
Sportspeople from the Province of Vicenza